Sarwate is a surname. Notable people with the surname include:

A. K. Sarwate (born 1945), Indian military officer
Aditya Sarwate (born 1989), Indian cricketer 
Chandu Sarwate (1920–2003), Indian cricketer
Vasant Sarwate (1927–2016), Indian cartoonist
Vinayak Sitaram Sarwate (1884–1972), Indian freedom fighter